NGC 4307  is an edge-on spiral galaxy located about 65 million light-years away in the constellation Virgo. It was discovered by astronomer Christian Peters in 1881 and is a member of the Virgo Cluster. It is also a LINER galaxy.

On March 7, 2019 a supernova of an unknown type known as AT 2019bpt was discovered in NGC 4307.

H I deficiency
NGC 4307 exhibits a deficiency in neutral hydrogen gas (H I) and contains a truncated gas disk. This suggests it has undergone ram-pressure stripping.

See also
 List of NGC objects (4001–5000)

References

External links

4307
040033
Virgo (constellation)
Astronomical objects discovered in 1881
Spiral galaxies
07431
Virgo Cluster
LINER galaxies